Keadue Rovers Football Club is a football club based in Keadue, County Donegal, currently playing in the Temple Domestic Appliance Division 1 in the Donegal Junior League. Founded in 1896, Keadue played their home games at Central Park. Nicknamed "The Gulls", Keadue are a well-respected junior football club in Ireland. The club's most famous past player is Packie Bonner, who signed for Celtic at the age of 17 from Keadue Rovers. Other famous sons to don the clubs famous candy stripes were Dennis Bonner Galway United, Tony Boyle, All Ireland winner with Donegal in 1992, Adrian Sweeney, Martin Ferry (formerly of Ayr United and Limavady United), Lee Boyle (formerly of Aston Villa) and Mark Forker (formerly of Hearts and Institute). Other names synonymous with the club are its most successful manager, Manus McCole, and groundskeeper, Anthony "Dutch" Doherty. The club celebrated its centenary in 1996 with Celtic playing a game at Central Park.

External links
Official website

1896 establishments in Ireland
Association football clubs in County Donegal
The Rosses
Ulster Senior League (association football) teams